is a tram station in Kōchi, Kōchi Prefecture, Japan.

Lines
Tosaden Kōtsū
Ino Line
Gomen Line
Sanbashi Line

Adjacent stations

Railway stations in Kōchi Prefecture
Railway stations in Japan opened in 1904